Opsimus is a genus of beetle in the family Cerambycidae, it contains a single species Opsimus quadrilineatus. It was described by Mannerheim in 1843.

References

Cerambycinae
Beetles described in 1843